Jayne Parsons (born 18 March 1962 in Lower Hutt) is a New Zealand paralympic cyclist who won a bronze medal at the 2008 Summer Paralympics along with tandem partner Annaliisa Farrell in the Women's Time trial. Parsons has visual impairments.

In 2011, Parsons was named as NEXT Woman of the Year in the Sport category.

References

External links 
 
 

1962 births
Living people
New Zealand female cyclists
Paralympic cyclists of New Zealand
Paralympic bronze medalists for New Zealand
Paralympic medalists in cycling
Cyclists at the 2008 Summer Paralympics
Medalists at the 2008 Summer Paralympics
Sportspeople from Lower Hutt
UCI Para-cycling World Champions